Anders Westerholm (1 September 1937 – 2004) was a Finnish footballer. He played in nine matches for the Finland national football team from 1959 to 1961.

References

1937 births
2004 deaths
Finnish footballers
Finland international footballers
Place of birth missing
Association footballers not categorized by position